Oveis Mallah (born 22 September 1966) is an Iranian former wrestler who competed in the 1992 Summer Olympics.

References

External links 

1966 births
Living people
Olympic wrestlers of Iran
Wrestlers at the 1992 Summer Olympics
Iranian male sport wrestlers
Asian Games gold medalists for Iran
Asian Games bronze medalists for Iran
Asian Games medalists in wrestling
Wrestlers at the 1990 Asian Games
Wrestlers at the 1994 Asian Games
Medalists at the 1990 Asian Games
Medalists at the 1994 Asian Games
20th-century Iranian people
21st-century Iranian people
World Wrestling Championships medalists